"Rockers Rollin'" / "Hold You Back" is a double A side single released by the British Rock band Status Quo in 1977. It was only released in certain countries.

Track listing 
 "Rockers Rollin'"
 "Hold You Back"

Charts

References 

Status Quo (band) songs
1977 singles
Songs written by Rick Parfitt
Song recordings produced by Pip Williams
Songs written by Francis Rossi
Songs written by Bob Young (musician)
1977 songs
Vertigo Records singles